The World Organization of Independent Scouts is an international Scouting organization for traditional Scouting.

Members

Full Members

 Brazil: Federação dos Escoteiros tradicionais
  Chile: Federación Nacional de Boy Scouts y Girl Guides de Chile
 Colombia: Asociación Colombiana de Scouts Independientes
 Ecuador: Asociación Ecuatoriana de Scouts
 Paraguay: Baden Powell Scouts Paraguay 
 Turkey: Federation of Scouts Union of Thrace
 Uruguay: Scouts del Uruguay
 Venezuela: Associación Civil Scouts Independientes de Venezuela

Prospect members

 Armenia: Scouts Armenios Chiraks
 Cyprus: Cyprus Turkish Scouts Volunteers Association
 Ghana: Ghana Peace Scouts
 Haiti: Scout Anglican d'Haiti
 India: Scouts / Guides India
 Ivory Coast: Eclaireurs Neutres de Côte d'Ivoire
 Kosovo: Scouts of Kosovo
 Liberia: Deaf Scout Association of Liberia
 Mexico: Hermandad Scout Independientes de México
 Mexico: Exploradores México Nuevo Rumbo, Asociación Civi I
 Peru: Master Scout del Peru
 Peru: Asociación Nacional Scouts Independientes de Peru
 Portugal: Escoteiros Indepenientes de Portugal
 Spain: Scout Independientes de España
 United Kingdom: Britain's Independent Scout Organisation

Former members
 Argentina: Asociación Scouts y Guías de la República Argentina
 Argentina: Unión Argentina de Scouts Independientes
 Argentina: Institucion Argentina de Scoutismo Adulto
 Argentina: Scouts Navales de Argentina 
 Argentina: Asociación Nacional Civil de Scouts Independientes Argentina- ANCASI 
 Brazil: Associação de Escoteiros do Mar do Distrito Federal
 Chile: Agrupación de Guías y Scouts Cristianos de Chile
 Chile: Scouts Tradicionales Chillán - Ñuble 
 Colombia: Asociación Colombiana de Scout Independientes
 Colombia: Organización Scouts Independientes de Colombia 
 Colombia: Corporación de Scouts Tradicionales Colombia 
 Guinea-Bissau: Federacao Dos Escoteiros Tradicionais - FET
 India: Peace Scouts and Guides India
 India: Venture Youth Movement of Scouts
 Italy: Associazione Scautistica Cattolica Italiana
 Mexico: Asociación de Grupos Scouts de México
 Mexico: Asociacion Nacional Escultista Caballeros Y Guias Aztecas A.C.
 Nepal: Nepal Peace Scouts (Nepal Shanti Scouts)
 Paraguay: Asociación Scout Baden Powell del Paraguay
 Paraguay: Unión de Scouts Navales y Aeronavales del Paraguay
 Peru: Scouts Tradicionales Peru

Emblem 
The membership badge for youth is a white Fleur-de-lis with two azure five-point stars on an azure background. The membership badge for adults is an azure Fleur-de-lis on a white background.

History
The  World Organization of Independent Scouts was founded in 2010 by former members of the World Federation of Independent Scouts. The organization started with around 15,000 members.

References

International Scouting organizations
Non-aligned Scouting organizations
Organizations established in 2010